The R45 is a provincial route in Western Cape, South Africa that connects Saldanha with Villiersdorp via Vredenburg, Malmesbury and Paarl. The route is mostly a two-lane wide-shouldered highway, however sections within Paarl and between Vredenburg and Saldanha are dual-carriageways. The R45 is co-signed with the N7 for a short segment north of Malmesbury.

Route
The north-western terminus of the R45 is in Saldanha on the West Coast. The route initially heads north-north-east for twelve kilometres to Vredenburg. Here it intersects with the R399. The R399 continues straight, while the R45 turns right. The left turn is unsigned, heading to Paternoster. Exiting Vredenburg to the east-south-east, it runs for nine kilometres before crossing the R27. After another seven kilometres, the route passes through Langebaanweg. Running 22 kilometres further on, the route passes through Hopefield. After another 14 kilometres, the R311 branches off to the left, heading east to Moorreesburg. The next major intersection, after ten kilometres, is the R307, branching to the right to Darling. The R45 continues for a further 31 kilometres to meet the N7.

The two roads continue south towards Malmesbury together for 2.5 kilometres, where the R45 is given off at an interchange and heads south-east through the town. After three kilometres, the route meets the R302 at a four-way intersection. The R302 continues south towards Durbanville, while the R45 turns left, exiting the town to the east-north-east. After four kilometres, the R46 branches off to the left, heading to Riebeek-Kasteel. The route veers south-east, running for 30 kilometres to intersect with the R44. It then runs south for five kilometres before turning right to intersect at a T-junction with a north–south road. The north road is unsigned, while the R45 turns left towards Paarl. Entering Paarl from the north, this road ends at a t-junction with the R45 turning right for one block and then left at a four-way intersection. Continuing for another kilometre, it meets the R101, becoming co-signed. These two routes continue together southwards for five kilometres, exit Paarl from the south and interchanging with the N1 before the R45 leaves to the left, heading south again.

After ten kilometres, the R310 is given off to the right, heading to Pniel and Stellenbosch. The R45 then veers east, reaching Wemmershoek. Here, the R301 leaves to the left, heading north. Continuing east, it passes through Franschhoek after six kilometres. The road ends at a t-junction, but the R45 continues by turning left, entering the Franschhoek Pass. After 28 kilometres, the road again ends at a T-junction. The R45 turns left here, with the right turn signed as the R321 over the Theewaterskloof Dam to Grabouw. The south-eastern terminus of the R45 is reached at a T-junction in Villiersdorp after another eight kilometres. The road continuing straight is then signposted as the R43 north to Worcester, while the right turn is also designated as the R43, south to the N2 between Bot River and Caledon.

References

External links
 Routes Travel Info

45
Provincial routes in South Africa